Propiomazine, sold under the brand name Propavan among others, is an antihistamine which is used to treat insomnia and to produce sedation and relieve anxiety before or during surgery or other procedures and in combination with analgesics as well as during labor. Propiomazine is a phenothiazine, but is not used therapeutically as a neuroleptic because it does not block dopamine receptors well.

Medical uses
Propiomazine has been used in the treatment of insomnia, though little evidence exists to inform its use for this indication.

Side effects
Drowsiness is a usual side effect. Rare, serious side effects include convulsions (seizures); difficult or unusually fast breathing; fast or irregular heartbeat or pulse; fever (high); high or low blood pressure; loss of bladder control; muscle stiffness (severe); unusual increase in sweating; unusually pale skin; and unusual tiredness or weakness.

Pharmacology

Pharmacodynamics
Propiomazine is an antagonist of the dopamine D1, D2, and D4 receptors, the serotonin 5-HT2A and 5-HT2C receptors, the muscarinic acetylcholine receptors M1, M2, M3, M4, and M5 receptors, α1-adrenergic receptor, and histamine H1 receptor.

The antipsychotic effect of propiomazine is thought to be due to antagonism of the dopamine D2 receptor and serotonin 5-HT2A receptor, with greater activity at the 5-HT2A receptor than at the D2 receptor. This may explain the lack of extrapyramidal effects with propiomazine. Propiomazine does not appear to block dopamine within the tuberoinfundibular pathway, which may explain its lower incidence of hyperprolactinemia than with typical antipsychotics or risperidone.

Chemistry
Propiomazine, also known as 10-(2-dimethylaminopropyl)-2-propionylphenothiazine or as propionylpromethazine, is a phenothiazine derivative and is structurally related to promethazine. The compound is provided medically as the hydrochloride and maleate salts.

Society and culture

Brand names
Propiomazine has been sold under the brand names Dorevan, Dorévane, Indorm, Largon, Phenoctyl, Propavan, Propial, and Serentin.

Availability
In 2000, propiomazine continued to be marketed only in Sweden.

References 

H1 receptor antagonists
Hypnotics
Ketones
Muscarinic antagonists
Phenothiazines
Sedatives